This was the first edition of the tournament as part of the WTA 125K series.

Liang En-shuo and Rebecca Marino won the title, defeating Erin Routliffe and Aldila Sutjiadi in the final, 5–7, 7–5, [10–7].

Seeds

Draw

Draw

External Links
Main Draw

LTP Women's Open - Doubles
LTP Charleston Pro Tennis